The Xeon D is a brand of x86 system on a chip designed, manufactured, and marketed by Intel, targeted at the microserver market. It was announced in 2014, with the first products released in 2015.  Related to the Xeon brand of workstation and server processors are based on the same architecture as server-grade CPUs, with support for ECC memory, higher core counts, support for larger amounts of RAM, larger cache memory. Unique to the Xeon D line, emphasis was also made on low power consumption, and integrated hardware blocks such as a network interface controllers, a PCI express root complex, and USB and SATA controllers.

Design Goals
The Xeon D was designed to offer better performance per watt compared to the Xeon E3 and better absolute performance compared to the Atom processors, while operating at lower power and higher densities than Xeon E5 processors. Particularly, the Xeon D was designed to compete with emerging ARM microarchitecture based server solutions, by offering superior single core performance.

Generations

Broadwell Based

Skylake Based

The Skylake (D-2100) Xeon D products were released in February 2018. Updates included an increased maximum number of cores, the Skylake microarchitecture, AVX-512 acceleration, and cryptographic acceleration. The second generation also offered increased clock speeds, resulting in greater performance, though the maximum thermal design power also increased. However, the level of AVX-512 support is unclear by product, with higher end products having greater performance than the listed specifications.

Hewitt Lake Based
Intel announced a second generation of Xeon D products to succeed the Broadwell (D-1500) series, Codenamed Hewitt Lake in February 2019.

Ice Lake Based

Intel announced the next generation of Xeon D, codenamed Ice Lake-D in April 2021. Intel official launched the Xeon D D-2700 series and D-1700 series CPUs at MWC 2022.

 Max capacity dependent on memory type

References 

Computer-related introductions in 2014
Xeon D